All This and Puppet Stew is the sixth and latest studio album by the Los Angeles punk rock band the Dickies, released in 2001 on Fat Wreck Chords. While the band remains a touring entity, All This and Puppet Stew is their penultimate studio album.

Production
The band recorded the album over a period of five years; they at times had to be nudged to return to the studio by Fat Wreck Chords.

Critical reception
The East Bay Express wrote that "nobody is better than the Dickies when it comes to writing dumb songs ... 'See My Way', 'Watching the Skies', and 'Free Willy' effortlessly cram fiery guitars and kickass drumming into a two-minute song and transform it into something you can hum for years and years." The Sunday Herald Sun called the album a "classic," writing that "the catchy and melodic guitars of Stan Lee and the fast, cartoonish vocal style of Leonard Graves Phillips still drive their core sound."

Track listing

Personnel 
 Leonard Graves Phillips – vocals, keyboards
 Stan Lee – guitar
 Little Dave Teague – guitar
 Rick Dasher – bass, vocals
 Travis Johnson – drums
 Glen Laughlin - guitar (Donut Man & Whack the Dalai Lama), mandolin (Marry Me, Ann), vocals
 Recorded at Motor Studios, San Francisco, California, Roundhouse Recording (Toluca Lake, CA) and West Beach Studios, Hollywood, California, US
 Produced by Ryan Greene and Adam Krammer
 Engineered by Ryan Greene, Don Cameron and Glen Laughlin (O.D. engineer Donut Man & Whack the Dalai Lama)

References

External links 
 Fat Wreck Chords album page

2001 albums
The Dickies albums
Fat Wreck Chords albums
Albums produced by Ryan Greene